Fitch Robertson (February 12, 1896 – March 5, 1956) was Mayor of Berkeley, California, United States, from 1943 to 1947.

He was born February 12, 1896, in Pueblo, Colorado.

Robertson was a graduate of the Colorado School of Mines.  He served during World War I in a U.S. Army engineering battalion.  He came to Berkeley in 1929.  He married Myla Kenworthy, with whom he had four children. A member of the BPOE Berkeley Elks Lodge # 1002.

After the City Manager announced his intention to resign as of January 15, 1947, the Berkeley City Council chose Mayor Robertson to replace him which it did on January 20.  The Vice Mayor, 80-year-old Carrie Hoyt then assumed the office of Mayor to finish out Robertson's term, thus becoming Berkeley's first female mayor.

Robertson died at his Walnut Creek, California home on March 5, 1956.

References
 Berkeley Gazette, March 6, 1956
The Voter, newsletter of the League of Women Voters of Berkeley, Albany and Emeryville, December 2003-January 2004 issue

1896 births
People from Pueblo, Colorado
Colorado School of Mines alumni
United States Army personnel of World War I
Mayors of Berkeley, California
1956 deaths
20th-century American politicians